National Route 397 is a national highway of Japan connecting Ōfunato, Iwate and Yokote, Akita in Japan, with a total length of 137.8 km (85.62 mi).

References

National highways in Japan
Roads in Akita Prefecture
Roads in Iwate Prefecture